Horyn is a tributary of the Pripyat River which flows through Ukraine and Belarus.

Horyń may also refer to:

Bohdan Horyn (born 1936), Ukrainian politician
Cathy Horyn (born 1956),  American fashion critic and journalist
Mykhailo Horyn (1930–2013), Ukrainian politician
Mykola Horyn (born 1945), Governor of Lviv Oblast, Ukraine (1994–1997)

See also
Goryń (disambiguation)